Týnec nad Sázavou is a town in Benešov District in the Central Bohemian Region of the Czech Republic. It has about 5,700 inhabitants.

Administrative parts
Villages of Brodce, Čakovice, Chrást nad Sázavou, Krusičany, Pecerady, Podělusy and Zbořený Kostelec are administrative parts of Týnec nad Sázavou.

Geography
It lies in the Benešov Uplands. The Sázava River flows through the town. There is a set of ponds in the southern part of the municipal territory, supplied by the Janovický Stream (a tributary of the Sázava).

History

The first written mention of Týnec nad Sázavou is from 1318, when Oldřich of Týnec was documented as the owner of the local castle. The oldest part of the castle is a Romanesque rotunda, which indicates that the castle was built around 1200. In 1622, after the Battle of White Mountain, the town was acquired by Albrecht von Wallenstein. During his rule, the castle was burned down and the town was devastated. The castle was partially repaired, but in 1654, it burned down for the second time and became a ruin.

In 1785, Týnec was acquired by Count František Josef of Vrtba, who restored importance to the neglected town. He founded a factory for earthenware here, and had the Týnec Castle with its Romanesque rotunda repaired.

Demographics

Economy
A traditional Czech manufacturer of motorcycles and mopeds, Jawa Moto, is based in the town.

Sights

The most valuable building and landmark of the town is the Romanesque rotunda, which is a part of the castle. Today, the Týnec Castle houses the Town Museum. Its Gothic tower serves as a lookout tower.

The Church od Saints Simon and Jude is originally a Gothic building, rebuilt in the Baroque style.

The Church od Saints Catherine is located in Chrást nad Sázavou. It was built in the first half of the 14th century and rebuilt into its current neo-Gothic form in 1888–1889.

Gallery

References

External links

Cities and towns in the Czech Republic
Populated places in Benešov District